Robert of Rouen (died before 1112) was the first bishop of Lydda and Ramla from 1099.

Bishop 

Born in the Roman Catholic Archdiocese of Rouen, Robert was a Norman cleric who joined the First Crusade. The crusaders took possession of Ramla without fight on 30 June 1099, because the Muslim garrison had left it. The nearby Church of Saint George was an important shrine at Lydda and the crusaders decided to establish a Roman Catholic bishopric in the town. The crusader leaders appointed Robert as the first bishop of the new diocese. They also granted Ramla, Lydda and the nearby villages to the bishopric.

Being the only Roman Catholic bishop in Palestine, Robert consecrated Daimbert of Pisa as the Latin Patriarch of Jerusalem on Christmas Day in 1099.

Robert died before 1112 when his successor, Roger is first mentioned in a charter.

References

Sources 

 
 
 
 

Date of birth unknown
12th-century deaths
12th-century Roman Catholic bishops in the Kingdom of Jerusalem
Roman Catholic Diocese of Lydda and Ramla
Christians of the First Crusade
12th-century Normans